Pelc is a surname. Notable people with the surname include:

 Jan Pelc (born 1957), Czech writer
  (1924–2017), logician
 Stanislav Pelc (born 1955), Czechoslovak footballer
 Sylwia Pelc (born 1990), Polish volleyball player